The China Railways SL7 class steam locomotive was a class of 4-6-2 express passenger steam locomotives operated by the China Railway. They were originally built for the South Manchuria Railway (Mantetsu) to pull the Asia Express - Mantetsu's signature train and most iconic locomotive, whose images were used on fliers, posters, postage stamps, and even children's school textbooks, as a symbol of technology and modernism in Manchukuo and was used to demonstrate the success of Japan's imperial project.

History
It was one of the world's first steam locomotives to be fully streamlined, which reduced air resistance by 30%, and they were painted a distinctive Prussian blue colour. Design and manufacture of the Pashina class took only seven months, using a novel process of simultaneous design and manufacture. A group of American reporters who rode the inaugural "Asia Express" train, doubting that the Japanese could build such a locomotive, enquired as to which American manufacturer had built the locomotive for Mantetsu. After Yoshino replied that he had designed it, and that it had been built domestically using components sourced almost entirely from Japan and Manchukuo, the reporter asked which American university he and the other engineers had studied at, he answered that most had studied in Japan, but that many had gained experience in the US.

They were the first Mantetsu locomotives to be fitted with the Schmidt type E superheater, and were also equipped with a combustion chamber firebox, a feedwater heater, and an automatic stoker; the stoker was deemed essential, as it was calculated that human power could not supply the necessary quantities of coal fast enough. The tender bogies were fitted with Timken roller bearings. A Pashina class locomotive was used to pull Prince Chichibu's train when he visited Manchukuo in 1940. Following the suspension of the Asia Express in February 1943, they were used on ordinary express trains.

The first three were built by Mantetsu's Shahekou Works in 1934, with the next eight coming from Kawasaki in Japan, with パシナ979 (later パシナ10), completed on 21 October 1934, being the 1,500th steam locomotive to be built by Kawasaki. After experiments in the Kawanishi Aircraft Company's wind tunnel, the shape of the streamlining was redesigned, and the final unit, number 981 (later パシナ12) was built with the new design by Kawasaki in 1936.

Originally numbered パシナ970 through パシナ981, they were renumbered パシナ1–パシナ12 in Mantetsu's 1938 general renumbering.

Postwar

All twelve survived the Pacific War and at the end of the war were assigned to the Dalian depot, and were subsequently taken over by the Republic of China Railway. After the establishment of the People's Republic and the current China Railway, they were designated class ㄆㄒ7 (PX7) in 1951, becoming class SL7 (勝利, Shènglì, "victory") in 1959; they were numbered within the 751–770 range. They remained in use on the Shenda Line between Dalian and Shenyang into the 1980s. Several locomotives were converted to a standard type because the cover of the locomotives are obstructive to inspect.

SL7 753-755 were noted to be in dump around Sujiatun Locomotive Depot in 1980s. SL7 751 was restored to fully working condition in 1984, and is displayed at the Shenyang Railway Museum. In 2001, the restoration of SL7 757 was completed in Dalian, and it has been on display at the Shenyang Railway Museum since 2013.

Gallery

References

4-6-2 locomotives
CRRC Dalian locomotives
Kawasaki locomotives
Railway locomotives introduced in 1934
Railway locomotives introduced in 1936
Steam locomotives of China
Standard gauge locomotives of China
Rolling stock of Manchukuo
Streamlined steam locomotives 
Passenger_locomotives